Claude Henri Édouard Frikart (5 March 1922 – 18 December 2014) was a French Prelate of Roman Catholic Church, and member of the Congregation of Jesus and Mary (Eudists, C.I.M.). He was also author of L'Eglise: 15 questions sur son histoire (2003) answering difficult questions.

Frikart was born in Ermont, France and ordained a priest on 2 July 1948 from the religious order of Congregation of Jesus and Mary. Frikart was appointed auxiliary archbishop to the Paris Archdiocese on 21 June 1986 as well as the titular bishop of Summula and ordained bishop on 2 September 1961. Frikart retired on 2 September 1997 as auxiliary archbishop.

References

External links
Parisian Archdiocese (French)

1922 births
2014 deaths
People from Ermont
20th-century Roman Catholic bishops in France
Auxiliary bishops of Paris
Eudist bishops